Silver Creek is an unincorporated community in Delaware County, Iowa, United States. It is located on County Highway D47, one mile north of Robinson and two miles southeast of Monti.

History
Silver Creek was also known as Silvercreek. The post office was established under the name Silver Creek on June 13, 1890. The name was changed  to Silvercreek on December 1, 1895. The post office closed on October 15, 1900.

Silver Creek's population was just 10 in 1902, and 11 in 1915. Silver Creek United Methodist church still operates in the community.

References

Unincorporated communities in Delaware County, Iowa
Unincorporated communities in Iowa